The Czechoslovakia women's national under-18 volleyball team represents Czechoslovakia in international women's volleyball competitions and friendly matches under the age 18 and it was ruled by the Czechoslovak Volleyball Federation That was a member of The Federation of International Volleyball FIVB and also a part of European Volleyball Confederation CEV.

Results

FIVB U18 World Championship
 Champions   Runners up   Third place   Fourth place

The Czechoslovakia women's national under18 volleyball team didn't compete in any European youth Championship cause the team was dissolved in late 1992 before the first European youth championship that take place in 1995.

References

External links

Official website
FIVB profile

National women's under-18 volleyball teams
Volleyball in Czechoslovakia